Neoplectrura breedlovei is a species of beetle in the family Cerambycidae, and the only species in the genus Neoplectrura. It was described by Chemsak and Linsley in 1983.

References

Parmenini
Beetles described in 1983